The Daily News of Kingsport, Tennessee is the city's only locally owned newspaper, publishing regularly since 1971 as a daily. The newspaper changed to two combined issues (Monday through Wednesday) and (Thursday through Sunday) in late 2012 to better accommodate its fast-growing readership throughout the Kingsport, Johnson City, and Scott County, Virginia areas.

History
The newspaper has served the Kingsport area since its beginnings as a weekly called The Post in 1963. After being a paid newspaper for nearly 40 years, the Daily News elected to become the Tri-Cities' only free daily newspaper a few years ago. While the larger paid newspapers across the country continue to struggle with declining circulation, the Daily News readership has increased dramatically as a free newspaper.

External links
 Daily News Online

Kingsport, Tennessee
Newspapers published in Tennessee
Newspapers established in 1963
1963 establishments in Tennessee